Qarah Aghol (also Romanized as Qarah Āghol) is a village in Chaldoran-e Shomali Rural District, in the Central District of Chaldoran County, West Azerbaijan Province, Iran. At the 2006 census, its population was 151, in 26 families.

References 

Populated places in Chaldoran County